Rufloxacin is a quinolone antibiotic. It is sold under the brand names, Ruflox, Monos, Qari, Tebraxin, Uroflox, Uroclar.

See also 
 Quinolones

References 

Fluoroquinolone antibiotics
Thiazines
1,4-di-hydro-7-(1-piperazinyl)-4-oxo-3-quinolinecarboxylic acids